The 2023 J1 League, also known as the  for sponsorship reasons, is the 31st season of the J1 League, the top Japanese professional league for association football clubs, since its establishment in 1993.

Yokohama F. Marinos are the defending champions, having won their fifth J.League and seventh Japanese title in 2022 in the final match of the season.

Overview
Only one club will be relegated to the J2 League at the end of the season, as the number of clubs will be expanded from 18 to 20 clubs from the 2024 season.

Changes from the previous season
There were two teams relegated last season to the 2023 J2 League. Shimizu S-Pulse and Júbilo Iwata, both from Shizuoka Prefecture, were relegated due to them finishing 17th and 18th respectively the previous season. Thus, this is the first Japanese top-flight season to not feature any team from the region.

Kyoto Sanga finished on 16th place, but won the promotion/relegation playoffs against Roasso Kumamoto and thus retained their top league status. Had Roasso won, it would have been their first ever promotion to the top-flight.

Two teams were promoted from the 2022 J2 League: Albirex Niigata, who won the title and returned to J1 after a five-year absence, and Yokohama FC, who finished second, returning to the J1 after just a season playing on the J2 League.

Participating clubs

Personnel and kits

Managerial changes

Transfers 

The winter transfer window is opened from 6 January to 31 March, while the summer transfer window will be from 21 July to 18 August.

Foreign players
From the 2021 season, there is no limitations on signing foreign players, but clubs could only register up to five of them for a single matchday squad. Players from J.League partner nations (Thailand, Vietnam, Myanmar, Malaysia, Cambodia, Singapore, Indonesia, and Qatar) were exempted from these restrictions.

Players name in bold indicates the player is registered during the mid-season transfer window.
Player's name in italics indicates the player has Japanese nationality in addition to their FIFA nationality, holds the nationality of a J.League partner nation, or is exempt from being treated as a foreign player due to having been born in Japan and being enrolled in, or having graduated from an approved type of school in the country.

League table

Results table

Season statistics

Top scorers

Hat-tricks

Notes
5 Player scored 5 goals
(H) – Home team
(A) – Away team

Top assists

Clean sheets

Discipline

Player
 Most yellow cards: 3
 Keigo Higashi (FC Tokyo)
 Yuri Lara (Yokohama FC)
 Keiya Shiihashi (Kashiwa Reysol)

 Most red cards: 1
 Ryotaro Araki (Kashima Antlers)
 Jesiel (Kawasaki Frontale)
 Yoichi Naganuma (Sagan Tosu)
 Katsuya Nagato (Yokohama F. Marinos)
 Hotaka Nakamura (FC Tokyo)
 Diego Pituca (Kawasaki Frontale)
 Kaishu Sano (Kashima Antlers)
 Kazuya Yamamura (Kawasaki Frontale)

Club
 Most yellow cards: 9
Avispa Fukuoka
Yokohama FC

 Most red cards: 3
Kashima Antlers

Awards

Monthly awards

See also 

 2023 Gamba Osaka season

 2023 Kashima Antlers season

 2023 Kawasaki Frontale season

 2023 Sanfrecce Hiroshima season

 2023 Urawa Red Diamonds season
 2023 Vissel Kobe season

 2023 Yokohama F. Marinos season

References

External links 
 English official website
 Japanese official website
 J.League Data Site 
 J.League Data Site 

J1 League seasons
1
Japan
Japan